An error amplifier is most commonly encountered in feedback unidirectional voltage control circuits, where the sampled output voltage of the circuit under control, is fed back and compared to a stable reference voltage. Any difference between the two generates a compensating error voltage  which tends to move the output voltage towards the design specification.

An error amplifier is essentially what its name says, that is, it amplifies an error signal. This error is based on the difference between a reference signal and the input signal. It can also be treated as the difference between the two inputs. These are usually used in unison with feedback loops, owing to their self-correcting mechanism. They have an inverting and a non-inverting input pin set, which is what is responsible for the output to be the difference of the inputs.

Devices
Discrete Transistors
Operational amplifiers

Applications
Regulated power supply.
D.C Power Amplifiers
Measurement Equipment
Servomechanisms

See also
Differential amplifier

External links 

 Error Amplifier Design and Application , alphascientific.com.  Originally accessed 27 April 2009, now 404.  Try https://web.archive.org/web/20081006222215/http://www.alphascientific.com/technotes/technote3.pdf
 Error amplifier as an element in a voltage regulator:Stability analysis of low-dropout linear regulators with a PMOS pass element 

Electronic amplifiers